Neomordellistena albopygidialis is a beetle in the genus Neomordellistena of the family Mordellidae. It was described in 1950 by Ermisch.

References

albopygidialis
Beetles described in 1950